Leicester was a parliamentary borough in Leicestershire, which elected two members of parliament (MPs) to the House of Commons from 1295 until 1918, when it was split into three single-member divisions.

History
Leicester sent burgesses to Parliament for the first time in 1295. Originally both Members were chosen by the whole 'commons' of the borough until at least 1407, when Thomas Denton and John Tonge were stated to have been chosen 'per totam communitatem tocius burgi'. At some unknown date before the middle of the 15th century, however, the 'commons', lost power within the borough and were restricted to the election of just one of the Members, the other being chosen by the mayor and 24 jurats (or aldermen). This situation was reversed by the middle of the sixteenth century.

Although most Members were citizens, usually officials, of the borough there was considerable influence and involvement by the two leading families, the Hastings and the Greys during the 16th and 17th centuries.

The constituency was abolished in 1918 and replaced by Leicester East, Leicester South and Leicester West.

Members of Parliament

1295–1640

1640–1918

Notes

Election results

Elections in the 1830s

Duckworth resigned after being appointed as Master of the Court of Chancery.

Elections in the 1840s

 
 

The election was declared void on petition on 1 June 1848, due to bribery by Walmsley and Gardner's agents, causing a by-election.

Elections in the 1850s

 
 

Gardner's death caused a by-election.

Elections in the 1860s
Noble's death caused a by-election.

 

Biggs resigned, causing a by-election.

Elections in the 1870s

Elections in the 1880s

 

Taylor resigned, causing a by-election.

Elections in the 1890s

Both Picton and Whitehead resigned. The House of Commons passed separate resolutions for two by-elections, and two separate election writs were issued to Leicester Corporation. However, Israel Hart, the mayor of Leicester, decided to economise by holding a single by-election for both vacancies. In 1895, a select committee of the Commons reported that this procedure was incorrect, but that since it was adopted in good faith and without objection from any of the candidates, the result would be allowed to stand.

Elections in the 1900s

Elections in the 1910s

Notes and References
Notes

References

 D. Brunton & D. H. Pennington, Members of the Long Parliament (London: George Allen & Unwin, 1954)
 
 The Constitutional Year Book for 1913 (London: National Union of Conservative and Unionist Associations, 1913)
 F W S Craig, British Parliamentary Election Results 1832–1885 (2nd edition, Aldershot: Parliamentary Research Services, 1989)
 J E Neale, The Elizabethan House of Commons (London: Jonathan Cape, 1949)
 J Holladay Philbin, Parliamentary Representation 1832 – England and Wales (New Haven: Yale University Press, 1965)

Parliamentary constituencies in Leicestershire (historic)
Constituencies of the Parliament of the United Kingdom established in 1295
Constituencies of the Parliament of the United Kingdom disestablished in 1918
History of Leicester
Politics of Leicester